Seven Keys to Baldpate is a 1913 play by George M. Cohan based on a novel by Earl Derr Biggers. The dramatization was one of Cohan's most innovative plays. It baffled some audiences and critics but became a hit, running for nearly a year in New York, another year in Chicago and receiving later revivals; Cohan starred in the 1935 revival. Cohan adapted it as a film in 1917, and it was adapted for film six more times, and later for TV and radio. The play "mixes all the formulaic melodrama of the era with a satirical [farcical] send-up of just those melodramatic stereotypes."

Synopsis
Novelist Billy Magee makes a bet with a wealthy friend that he can write a 10,000 word story within 24 hours. He retires to a summer mountain resort named Baldpate Inn, in the dead of winter, and locks himself in, believing he has the sole key. However he is visited during the night by a rapid succession of other people (melodrama stock types), including a corrupt politician, a crooked cop, a hermit, a feisty girl reporter, a gang of criminals, etc., none of whom have any trouble getting into the remote inn—there appear to be seven keys to Baldpate.

Magee gets no work done, instead being drawn into the hijinks of the other visitors. He eventually foils a plot by the crooks to steal money from the hotel safe that is earmarked for a city street railroad deal, and he falls in love with the reporter. He observes derisively that all of these complicated incidents and characters are ones that he has written over and over again. Just before midnight, he finds out that everyone is an actor hired to perpetrate a hoax, orchestrated by Magee's friend to keep him from completing the story.

In the epilogue, the inn is empty, and a typewriter is clattering upstairs: Magee has finished his story before midnight and won the bet. He reveals that nothing had happened during the 24 hours; all the preceding melodrama, including the actors and hoax, constitute the story.

Characters
Elijah Quimby, the caretaker of Baldpate Inn – Edgar Halstead
Mrs. Quimby, the caretaker's wife – Jessie Grahame
William Hallowell Magee, the novelist – Wallace Eddinger
John Bland, the millionaire's right-hand man – Purnell Pratt
Mary Norton, the newspaper reporter – Margaret Greene
Mrs. Rhodes, the charming widow – Lorena Atwood
Peter, the Hermit of Baldpate – Joseph Allen
Myra Thornhill, the blackmailer – Gail Kane
Lou Max, the mayor's man "Friday" – Roy Fairchild
Jim Cargan, the crooked mayor of Reuton – Martin Alsop
Thomas Hayden, the president of the R. and E. Suburban R.R. – Claude Brooke
Jiggs Kennedy, Chief of Police of Asquewan Falls – Carlton Macy
The Owner of the Baldpate Inn, Magee's friend – John C. King

Reception
The play premiered on Broadway on September 22, 1913 at the Astor Theatre and ran for 320 performances. The New York Times drama critic called it "melodrama of the good, old-fashioned sort".

Cohan and his daughter were severely injured in a car crash during rehearsal of the original production.

Although a 1935 revival, starring Cohan in the lead, was less successful, running only a week, it remains Cohan's most popular play.

Adaptations
The play was filmed several times, with versions appearing in 1916 (from Australia), 1917 (starring Cohan himself), 1925 (with Douglas MacLean), 1929 (with Richard Dix), 1935 (with Gene Raymond), 1947 (with Phillip Terry), and 1983 (as House of the Long Shadows). Television adaptations appeared in 1946 and 1961.

The play was also adapted for radio in 1938 (for Lux Radio Theatre with Jack Benny) and 1946 (for Theatre Guild on the Air with Walter Pidgeon).

References

External links
 Full text of the play at Internet Archive

 
 Full text of original novel at Project Gutenberg
 Article on the initial production of Seven Keys to Baldpate
 1938 Lux Radio Theatre version at Internet Archive
1946 Theatre Guild on the Air radio version at Internet Archive

1913 plays
Plays based on novels
Plays by George M. Cohan
 Play